George Hinckley Lyman (December 13, 1850 – May 17, 1945) was an American political figure who served as chairman of the Massachusetts Republican state committee and collector of customs for the port of Boston.

Early life
Lyman was born in Boston on December 13, 1850. His father, also named George H. Lyman was a prominent Boston doctor. His great-grandfather was Elbridge Gerry, a signer of the Declaration of Independence and Vice President of the United States. Lyman graduated from Boston Latin School, St. Paul's School, Harvard College, and Harvard Law School. After spending one year of study in Germany, Lyman returned to Boston to complete his legal training with the firm of Ropes, Gray, & Loring.

Political activities
Lyman was an active member of the Republican Party in Boston. He served as treasurer of the Ward 11 Republican committee, treasurer of the Boston Republican city committee, a member of the finance committee of the Massachusetts Republican Club, and represented the Fifth Suffolk district on the Republican state committee. From 1893 to 1895 he was chairman of the Massachusetts Republican state committee's finance committee. On January 3, 1895, Lyman was unanimously elected chairman of the Republican state committee. In 1896 he was elected to the Republican National Committee.

Collector of customs
On February 17, 1898, Lyman was nominated by President William McKinley for the position of collector of customs for the district of Boston. His nomination was confirmed by the United States Senate five days later. On March 4 he resigned from the Republican National Committee, as he did not want his duties as collector and committeeman to conflict with each other. He took office on April 1. Lyman's administration as collector was described by A. Maurice Low of The Boston Daily Globe as having been "managed in the interest of both the government and the merchants doing business with the customhouse, and that there has been practically no friction." He was nominated for reappointment by President Theodore Roosevelt on January 8, 1902. In February 1902, The Boston Daily Globe reported that Massachusetts Governor Winthrop M. Crane and others suggested to President Roosevelt that Lyman would be an able successor to United States Secretary of the Navy John Davis Long. Roosevelt and Lyman were friends and Roosevelt respected Lyman's abilities as a business and his record as collector. U.S. Representative William Henry Moody was nominated instead. On October 17, 1903, United States Assistant Secretary of the Treasury Robert B. Armstrong commenced an investigation into frauds and irregularities at the Boston customhouse. Lyman was not blamed for the irregularities. On April 2, 1906, Lyman was sworn in for an unprecedented third term as collector. He was promised reappointment to a fourth term but chose to retire instead, citing "personal reasons".

Later life and death
In 1918, director of the Massachusetts Committee on Public Safety Henry Bradford Endicott appointed Lyman to chair a subcommittee of the Public Safety Committee to supervise groups that made public appeals for funds for patriotic purposes. The committee was formed to root out duplication of services, inefficiency, wastefulness, and dishonesty in patriotic societies. It was created soon after an organization known as "The Chain" began soliciting funds in Boston. The Chain's purported treasurer denied any involvement with organization's and Endicott believed its list of patrons was suspect as well. Lyman later wrote a book about the history of the Massachusetts Committee on Public Safety.

In 1927, Lyman was appointed to Boston's Municipal Sinking Funds Commission by Mayor Malcolm Nichols.

Lyman died on May 17, 1945, at his home on Commonwealth Avenue in Boston after a brief illness. He was buried at Mount Auburn Cemetery.

References

1850 births
1945 deaths
Boston Latin School alumni
Collectors of the Port of Boston
Harvard Law School alumni
Lawyers from Boston
Massachusetts Republican Party chairs
People from Manchester-by-the-Sea, Massachusetts
St. Paul's School (New Hampshire) alumni
Burials at Mount Auburn Cemetery